Rawer can refer to:

 an ancient Egyptian prince of the 4th Dynasty, son of Kaemsekhem
 Rawer (5th Dynasty), ancient Egyptian official of the 5th Dynasty
 Rawer (vizier), ancient Egyptian official of the 6th Dynasty
 Karl Rawer (1913-2018), German physicist

See also
 Raw (disambiguation)
 Rauer (disambiguation)